The UWA World Women's Tag Team Championship (in Japanese: UWA世界女子タッグ王座) was a professional wrestling tag team title defended in the Universal Wrestling Association (UWA) from 1992 to 1995, then revived in 2001. It was the primary female wrestling tag team title in the promotion and was defended in both Mexico and Japan. The belts themselves were brought back in 2001 when the previous champions Etsuko Mita and Mima Shimoda won them in tournament on the Japanese Independent circuit, but the belts have not been defended since the tournament.

As it was a professional wrestling championship, the championship was not won not by actual competition, but by a scripted ending to a match determined by the bookers and match makers. On occasion the promotion declares a championship vacant, which means there is no champion at that point in time. This can either be due to a storyline, or real life issues such as a champion suffering an injury being unable to defend the championship, or leaving the company.

Title history

Footnotes

See also
Women's World Tag Team Championship

References

External links
UWA World Women's Tag Team Title

Universal Wrestling Association championships
Women's professional wrestling tag team championships
World professional wrestling championships